The Little Ogeechee River in Hancock County is one of two rivers with that name in the U.S. state of Georgia.

See also
List of rivers of Georgia

References 

USGS Hydrologic Unit Map - State of Georgia (1974)

Rivers of Georgia (U.S. state)
Rivers of Hancock County, Georgia
Rivers of Washington County, Georgia